Phyllochoreia is a genus of grasshopper endemic to the Western Ghats of India and Sri Lanka. It is in the family Chorotypidae of the superfamily Eumastacoidea.

The genus comprises four species:

 Phyllochoreia equa Burr, 1899
 Phyllochoreia ramakrishnai Bolívar, 1914
 Phyllochoreia unicolor Westwood, 1839
 Phyllochoreia westwoodi Bolívar, 1930

The species Phyllochoreia ramakrishnai was named by Bolívar in 1914 after the Indian entomologist T. V. Ramakrishna Ayyar.

References 

Chorotypidae
Caelifera genera
Insects of India
Insects of Sri Lanka